Quantitative Economics is a peer-reviewed open access academic journal covering econometrics. It is sponsored by the Econometric Society, was established in 2010, and is published by Wiley-Blackwell. The editor-in-chief is Christopher Taber (University of Wisconsin–Madison). According to the Journal Citation Reports, the journal has a 2017 impact factor of 1.42, ranking it 129th out of 353 journals in the category "Economics".

References

External links

Econometrics journals
Wiley-Blackwell academic journals
Publications established in 2010
English-language journals
Academic journals associated with international learned and professional societies
Open access journals
Econometric Society